Haynes and Boone, LLP is an international corporate law firm with offices in Texas, New York, California, Charlotte, Colorado, Illinois, Washington, D.C., Shanghai, London, and Mexico City.

Haynes Boone has its headquarters in the One Victory Park building in Victory Park Dallas, Texas.

Strategic practice areas 

Areas of law practiced by Haynes Boone include Corporate/Securities, Banking & Finance, Energy, Real Estate, Intellectual Property, Labor & Employment, Employee Benefits and Executive Compensation, Technology, Healthcare, and all aspects of Business Litigation.

Haynes Boone is an American Lawyer Top 100 law firm with more than 600 lawyers in 18 offices around the world that provides services for more than 40 major legal practices. It is among the largest firms based in the United States.

History 

The firm was founded in 1970 by Richard Haynes and Michael Boone.
The firm's Managing Partner is Taylor Wilson.

Headquarters
Haynes Boone's headquarters are in the One Victory Park building in Uptown Dallas.

Sources

External links

 Haynes and Boone, LLP

Law firms based in Dallas
Law firms established in 1970